Jean Payne (12 May 1939 – 4 March 2020) was a member of the House of Commons of Canada from 1993 to 1997. She was born in St. John's, Newfoundland, and was a businessperson by career. 

She was elected in the 1993 federal election at the St. John's West electoral district for the Liberal party. Payne left federal politics after serving in the 35th Canadian Parliament and did not seek another term in office in the 1997 federal election.

References

External links
 

   

1939 births
2020 deaths
Liberal Party of Canada MPs
Businesspeople from St. John's, Newfoundland and Labrador
Members of the House of Commons of Canada from Newfoundland and Labrador
Politicians from St. John's, Newfoundland and Labrador
Women members of the House of Commons of Canada
Women in Newfoundland and Labrador politics